Orietta Grossi (born 20 June 1959) is an Italian basketball player. She competed in the women's tournament at the 1980 Summer Olympics.

References

1959 births
Living people
Italian women's basketball players
Olympic basketball players of Italy
Basketball players at the 1980 Summer Olympics
Basketball players from Rome